St. Julien Plantation is a historic plantation complex located near Eutawville, Orangeburg County, South Carolina. The plantation house was built about 1854, and is a two-story, L-shaped, vernacular farmhouse with Italianate influences.  It features a low-pitched hipped roof with projecting eaves and a bracketed cornice. Also on the property are the contributing log cotton warehouse, board and batten kitchen, Carpenter Gothic mule barn, smokehouse, garage, storage building, and several wood frame farm buildings.

It was added to the National Register of Historic Places in 1980.

References

Plantations in South Carolina
Houses on the National Register of Historic Places in South Carolina
Italianate architecture in South Carolina
Houses completed in 1854
Houses in Orangeburg County, South Carolina
National Register of Historic Places in Orangeburg County, South Carolina
Cotton plantations in the United States